No To Brussels - National Democracy or simply the National Democracy (short ND) is a national-conservative and eurosceptic political party in the Czech Republic. The party was founded in fall 2005 as "Law and Justice - Yes to traditional family, No to corruption and criminality" or simply the "Law and Justice", inspired by Polish party Prawo i Sprawiedliwość.

On 11 January 2014, the party transformed into the current No To Brussels - National Democracy, to bruit continuity with first Prime Minister of Czechoslovakia, Karel Kramář, and his Czechoslovak National Democracy.

For 2019 European Parliament election party announced united list with the Party of Common Sense.

In April 2019 party signed cooperation agreement with the Liberal Democratic Party of Russia.

Presidential

European Parliament

References

External links
Official website

Eurosceptic parties in the Czech Republic
2005 establishments in the Czech Republic
Political parties established in 2005
National conservative parties in the Czech Republic
Far-right political parties in the Czech Republic